Marquess of Del Bosque is a hereditary title in the Spanish nobility. The marquessate was bestowed by King Juan Carlos upon Vicente del Bosque, by Royal Decree 135/2011, on 3 February 2011 in recognition of his "great dedication to Spanish sport and the contribution of don Vicente del Bosque González to the promotion of sporting values". Del Bosque led Spain to their first ever World Cup title at the 2010 competition in South Africa.

His style of address is: Ilustrísimo Señor Marqués de Del Bosque ("The Most Illustrious The Marquess of Del Bosque").

Marquesses of Del Bosque (2011)
 Vicente del Bosque González, 1st Marquess of Del Bosque (b. 1950)

The heir apparent is the present holder's son Vicente del Bosque López (b. 1987)

See also

 Marquess of Ibias
 Marquess of Vargas Llosa
 Marquess of Villar Mir

References

Marquessates in the Spanish nobility
Noble titles created in 2011